Politiets Efterretningstjeneste (PET) (literally: Police Intelligence Service, official name in English: Danish Security and Intelligence Service, or DSIS) is the national security and  intelligence agency of Denmark. The agency focuses solely on national security, and foreign intelligence operations are handled by the Danish Defence Intelligence Service, the foreign intelligence service administered by the Danish Royal Defense.

The stated overall purpose of PET is to "prevent, investigate and counter operations and activities that pose or may pose a threat to the preservation of Denmark as a free, democratic and safe country".

History
The history of PET can be traced back to shortly before World War II when the Danish police force expanded to create the Sikkerhedspoliti (SIPO) (literally: Security Police).

Operations
The primary duties of the PET are counter-terrorism, counter-extremism, counter-espionage and security.

Counterterrorism encompass stopping terrorist attacks on Denmark and Danish interests, and preventing Denmark from being used as a base of operations for carrying out terrorist attacks in and against other countries. Furthermore, it attempts to gather evidence to ensure that terrorists are prosecuted. Denmark is obliged by UN and EU resolutions to support other states in prosecuting terrorists.

Aside from the three main areas, PET also provides counselling to Danish companies on how to avoid espionage but is directly involved in countering industrial espionage only if an agency of a foreign government is involved.  It has a role as national security advisor to the Danish government, public authorities and other branches of the police along with a number of other activities common to domestic security organisations.

PET also provides bodyguards for Danish royalty, politicians and other persons.

Organization
PET is a part of the Danish police but reports directly to the Minister of Justice.

The headquarters is in Copenhagen, and they have offices in Århus and Odense located in the local police stations. Because the service is integrated with the Danish police, they have representatives in all police precincts of Denmark.

The Security Department

The Security Department provides operational support to the other units of PET and the police districts through: the Special Intervention Unit, the Personal Protection Unit and the Negotiation Group. The Security Department also comprises: the Security Co-ordination Centre, which ensures ongoing prioritisation of, among other tasks, personal protection and security coordination assignments in relation to major events, state visits and similar.

Supervision and oversight
Several organs oversee PET in order to make sure the agency does not misuse its powers. 
 Ministry of Justice.
 The parliamentary budget committee (Rigsrevisionen) has oversight and supervision with the budgets.
 The Wamberg committee has oversight and supervision with the registration of people.
 Parliamentary intelligence agencies control committee, that consist of five members, from each of the five biggest parties.

Besides those listed the agency is also under the control of the Courts of Denmark (which has to approve many special steps of investigation, e.g. wire-tapping.)

Criticism and public relations
PET was criticised in the late 1990s for being closed to the public and has tried to counter these claims by adopting a more open approach. Thus PET has taken to maintain a website explaining its overall aims and obligations and publishing an annual public report surveying extremist activities in Denmark and the threat level to national domestic security (albeit only in a very overall fashion).

Following a report into the 2015 Copenhagen shootings, Jens Madsen resigned.

People with bodyguards
PET does not comment on whom they offer specific bodyguard protection. However, it is publicly established that the following people are under permanent protection:

Margrethe II of Denmark
Crown Prince Frederik of Denmark
Mette Frederiksen, prime minister of Denmark

These people have or have had at some time full-time protection:
Rasmus Paludan, politician and leader of the now defunct Hard Line anti-immigration political party (Dissolved by parliamentary order)
Pia Kjærsgaard, former speaker of the Danish parliament Folketinget, and former leader of the far-right political party Dansk Folkeparti
Helle Thorning-Schmidt, former Prime minister of Denmark and former leader of the Social Democrats
Lars Løkke Rasmussen, former Prime minister of Denmark and former leader of Venstre
Naser Khader, member of the Danish parliament
Kurt Westergaard, cartoonist
Crown Princess Mary of Denmark
Prince Joachim of Denmark
Lars Hedegaard, historian and journalist

See also
 Danish Defense Intelligence Service, (Forsvarets Efterretningstjeneste, FE),  its military counterpart
 Politiets Aktionsstyrke (AKS), the special response unit of the Danish police.
 The PET Commission.
 Intelligence (information gathering)
 Politics of Denmark

References

External links
 

Law enforcement agencies of Denmark
Danish intelligence agencies